Hugh Masekela Is Alive and Well at the Whisky is a 1967 live album by South African jazz musician Hugh Masekela released via Uni Records label. It was recorded live at the night club Whisky a Go Go, Hollywood, California, in 18 to 20 September 1967. The song "Up, Up and Away" was later included in his 2004 album Still Grazing.

Track listing

Personnel
Bass – Henry Franklin
Cover design, photography – Jeffery Eisen
Drums – Chuck Carter
Percussion  – Elmer Siegel (uncredited)
Piano – Cecil Barnard
Producer – Stewart Levine
Saxophone – Al Abreu
Trumpet, vocals – Hugh Masekela (uncredited)

References

External links

1967 live albums
Uni Records albums
Hugh Masekela albums
Albums produced by Stewart Levine
Albums recorded at the Whisky a Go Go